Vijay Amritraj was the defending champion but lost in the semifinals to Harold Solomon.

Rod Laver won in the final 6–4, 6–3 against Solomon.

Seeds
A champion seed is indicated in bold text while text in italics indicates the round in which that seed was eliminated.

  Rod Laver (champion)
  Harold Solomon (final)
  Eddie Dibbs (quarterfinals)
  Vijay Amritraj (semifinals)
  Jaime Fillol (second round)
  John Alexander (semifinals)
  Ismail El Shafei (first round)
  François Jauffret (quarterfinals)

Draw

External links
 1974 Volvo International draw

Singles